Christmas Coupon is a 2019 American romantic holiday film written and directed by Daniel Knudsen. Produced by Crystal Creek Media, the film's plot follows a figure skater who falls in love with a hockey player.

Plot 
The movie follows Alison Grant who is a former figure skating champion. She is now teaching ice skating lessons to children at a local rink. However, her boss cancels her classes for not bringing in enough students. After being let go by the rink, Alison starts out on her own by teaching skating lessons on a friend’s pond. Alison and her nieces hand out Christmas coupons for the new class to bring in students. One of the girls who joins brings her uncle Ivan to class with her. Ivan was Alison’s old high school sweetheart who left her years before when he received an offer to play major league hockey. Initially the two are at odds with each other, but after the cold reunion passes they start to become friends again. Eventually they rekindle their relationship and fall in love.

Cast 
 Courtney Mathews as Alison Grant
 Aaron Noble as Ivan Hall
 Bobby Laenen as Bobby
 Sheena Monnin as Lauren Holmes
 Daniel Knudsen as Chris McGill
 Nepoleon as Agent Kumar
 Drew Jacobs as Drew Williams
 Tim Kaiser as Nicholas Hodge
 Justin Mane as Thomas Holmes
 Tenley as Chloe Williams

Courtney Mathews and Aaron Noble star in the lead roles. Mathews plays former figure skating champion Alison Grant and Noble plays the hockey player Ivan Hall. Former Miss Pennsylvania Sheena Monnin co-stars in Christmas Coupon. It is the second American film that Indian actor Napoleon was a part of. Napoleon plays Ivan Hall’s major league sports agent in the film. Christmas Coupon includes a performance of “It’s Christmas Time Again” by Broadway singer Tom Rhoads. It also includes additional original soundtrack songs performed by Drew Jacobs and Yasmeen Suri.

Production 
Principal photography for Christmas Coupon took place around the holiday season in 2018. Various locations near Detroit, Michigan were used for filming.

Release 
Christmas Coupon is being distributed by Kyyba Films in India and East Asia and Crystal Creek Media in all other territories. A massive trailer launch event was held on June 29, 2019 in Chennai, India. The Dove seal of family approval was awarded to Christmas Coupon by the Dove Foundation. The movie was released on December 2, 2019 following a sold out premiere event near Detroit, Michigan.

References

External links 
 Official website
 

2019 films
2010s Christmas films
American Christmas films
American drama films
Films shot in Michigan
2010s English-language films
Films directed by Daniel Knudsen
2010s American films